A collegium (plural collegia) may refer to:

collegium (ancient Rome), a term applied to any association with a legal personality in ancient Rome
College of Pontiffs, the highest-ranking collection of priests of the state religion
a Latinized form of the Ancient Greek term hetaireia
Collegium Musicum, any of the university-oriented music societies of Reformation-era Germany and Switzerland
Collegium (ministry), an executive body of the central government in Russia
Collegium (school), a French form of schooling that is both a secondary school and a college
An outdated spelling of kollegium in Scandinavia
Hassagers Kollegium, a dormitory at Frederiksberg Bredegade, Frederiksberg, Denmark
Borchs Kollegium, a dormitory on Store Kannikestræde, Copenhagen, Denmark
 An alternative term  for some meanings of "College" (disambiguation)